The New Year's Day Hurdle was a National Hunt hurdle race in England which was open to horses aged four years and older. 
It was run at Windsor over a distance of 2 miles (3,218 metres), and was scheduled to take place each year on New Year's Day (January 1).

The race was first run in 1975 and was last run in 1998, when Windsor stopped hosting National Hunt racing.
National Hunt racing returned to Windsor temporarily in 2004 when Ascot was closed for renovations, and Windsor hosted the Long Walk Hurdle.

The race was initially a Conditions race, attracting high quality hurdlers, but became a Limited Handicap in 1993, reduced to an ordinary handicap in 1998.

Winners

See also
 Horse racing in Great Britain
 List of British National Hunt races

References

Racing Post:

National Hunt hurdle races
National Hunt races in Great Britain
Windsor Racecourse
Discontinued horse races
Recurring sporting events established in 1975
1975 establishments in England
Recurring sporting events disestablished in 1998
1998 disestablishments in England